André Barsacq (24 January 1909 – 8 July 1973) was a French theatre director, producer, scenic designer, and playwright. From 1940 to 1973 he was the director of the Théâtre de l'Atelier. He was the brother of Russian production designer Léon Barsacq and the uncle of film actor Yves Barsacq.

Life and career
Barsacq was born in the city of Feodosiya in Crimea. His father was French and his mother was Russian. At the age of 15 he traveled to Paris to study at the School of Decorative Arts and lived in France from then on. In 1928 he was at the Théâtre de l'Atelier working with its director, Charles Dullin on productions which included Jules Romains's 1923 play Knock.

As director of the Théâtre de l'Atelier he introduced Parisian audiences to the plays of Ugo Betti, Félicien Marceau, Marcel Ayme (The Moon Birds), Françoise Sagan, René de Obaldia, and Friedrich Dürrenmatt. He successfully adapted the works of Chekhov, Dostoevsky, and Turgenev for the French stage. During his career he worked with Antonin Artaud, Jean-Louis Barrault, and Jacques Copeau.

Barsacq was a great admirer of Jean Anouilh and beginning with Le Bal des voleurs at Théâtre des Arts in 1938 produced almost all his plays, including, at some personal risk, the subversive Antigone in 1944 during the Nazi occupation.

André Barsacq also worked with many major filmmakers including Marcel L'Herbier, Pierre Chenal, Jean Grémillon, Max Ophüls, and Pierre Billon.

Broadway shows 
 1963: Bérénice (director) Brooks Atkinson Theatre
 1960: The Good Soup (writer, director) Plymouth Theatre
 1957: Volpone (scenic design, costume design) Winter Garden Theatre

Filmography 

 Director and screenwriter
 1952:  Crimson Curtain (director and screenwriter)
 1960:  The Players (TV movie) (screenplay and adaptation)
 1964:  Castle in Sweden (TV movie) (director)
 1966:  A Month in the Country (TV movie) (director)
 1967:  King Stag (TV movie) (director)
 1968:  The Idiot (TV movie) (adaptation)
 1969:  The Government Inspector (TV movie) (director)
 1972:  The Birds of the Moon (TV movie) (director)
 1972:  David (the night falls (TV movie) (director)
 1972:  The Babur (TV movie) (director)
 1972:  The Villains (TV movie) (director)

 Production designer
 1928:  L'argent [dir: Marcel L'Herbier] (artistic director)
 1928:  Maldone [dir: Jean Grémillon] (scenic designer)
 1929:  The Lighthouse Keepers [dir: Jean Grémillon] (designer and assistant director)
 1934:  La dolorosa [dir: Jean Grémillon] (assistant director)
 1936:  Southern Mail [dir: Pierre Billon] (scenic designer)
 1937:  Yoshiwara [dir: Max Ophüls] (artistic director)
 1940:  Volpone [dir: Maurice Tourneur] (scenic designer)
 1942:  The Honorable Catherine [dir: Marcel L'Herbier] (artistic director)
 1942:  Summer Light [dir: Jean Grémillon] (artistic director)

References

External links 
 

 

1909 births
1973 deaths
People from Feodosia
People from Feodosiysky Uyezd
French people of Russian descent
French theatre directors
20th-century French dramatists and playwrights
French scenic designers
French film directors
Burials at Batignolles Cemetery
Soviet emigrants to France